The Beagle class was a two-ship class of 8-gun screw steel sloops built for the Royal Navy in 1889.

Design
Beagle and Basilisk were constructed of copper-sheathed steel to a design by William White, the Royal Navy Director of Naval Construction.  They were powered by a twin-screw three-cylinder horizontal triple-expansion steam engine developing  and carried a barquentine sail rig. They were essentially the same design as the preceding Nymphe class, but built of steel rather than of composite wood-and-steel.

Operational use
In common with other designs of Royal Navy sloop of the period, the Beagle class were not intended or designed to fight a modern fleet action; they were intended to patrol Britain's extensive maritime empire, and this is how they were employed.  Beagle conducted three foreign commissions between 1890 and 1900, at least two of which were on the South Atlantic Station. She was refitted in 1900, during which her  breech-loading guns were replaced with quick-firing guns.  Basilisk also spent all or part of her career on the South Atlantic Station.

Ships

References 

Sloop classes
 
 Beagle